Edward Silas Tobey (1813 – March 29, 1891, in Brookline, MA) was Postmaster of Boston Office, President of American Missionary Association and President of Boston Board of Trade.

References

Obituary: Rev. C. J. Ryder The American Missionary Volume 45, Issue 5. (New York: The American Missionary Association, May 1891).

External links
Obituary online

1813 births
1891 deaths
United Church of Christ
Massachusetts postmasters
American financial businesspeople
19th-century American businesspeople